Merlano is a surname. Notable people with the surname include:

Aída Merlano (born 1980), Colombian politician
Brigitte Merlano (born 1982), Colombian hurdler
Giorgio Merlano (born 1988), Italian footballer